Leevin Taitano Camacho is a Chamorro lawyer who served as attorney general of Guam. He was elected on November 6, 2018, defeating former attorney general Douglas Moylan with 67% of the vote. Inaugurated on January 7, 2019, Camacho succeeded Elizabeth Barrett-Anderson to become Guam's fifth elected AG.

Early life
Camacho was born to Lolita San Nicolas Taitano (Familian Asan and Familian Lucas) and Vincent G. Camacho (Familian Santiago and Familian Victoriano). The Camachos were a military family. He attended John F. Kennedy High School followed by the University of Washington.

Career
After graduating from Boston University School of Law in 2005, Camacho returned to Guam where he clerked for the Supreme Court of Guam.

Activism
Camacho is a founder of We Are Guåhan, an activist movement opposed to military buildup on Guam. He also was involved with Save Southern Guam, successfully convincing the Guam Land Use Commission to revoke construction permits for a hotel project in Pago Bay.

Attorney General of Guam

Election
In a primary election on August 25, 2018, Camacho garnered the most votes (nearly 50%) despite accusations of inexperience from his opponents. He went on to win the general election against Douglas Moylan in November.

Primary

General

Personal life
Camacho is married to Jennifer "Jen" Crisostomo Camacho (Familian Beyong and Familian BeckPing); they have two children, Matua and Tanom.

Camacho enjoys sports and competes in triathlons.

References

External links

Official Biography at the National Association of Attorneys General

1970s births
21st-century American politicians
American lawyers
Attorneys General of Guam
Guamanian lawyers
Boston University School of Law alumni
Living people